The 1938 Willesden East by-election was held on 28 July 1938.  The by-election was held due to the death of the incumbent Conservative MP, Daniel Somerville.  It was won by the Conservative candidate Samuel Hammersley.

Previous result

Result

References

Willesden East by-election
Willesden East,1938
Willesden East by-election
20th century in Middlesex
Willesden East,1938